Fotballklubben Sparta Sarpsborg is the football department of IL Sparta. Founded in 1928, the club got its present name in 2004. The club currently plays in 4. divisjon, the fifth tier of the Norwegian football league system.

History

1950s: The golden years
The club won the Norwegian Cup in 1952, having scored all the five goals in the final against Solberg which Sparta won 3–2. Sparta played in Hovedserien from its inception in 1948–49 until 1957–58, only interrupted by one season at the second tier. In the ten seasons at the top tier the average home attendances differed between 1,300 and 5,000.

1999–present: Collaborations and return to lower leagues
In 1999, 16 teams in the Sarpsborg area joined forces to create a team that could compete in the top divisions of Norwegian football, called Sarpsborg Fotball, which overtook Sarpsborg FK's spot in the third tier in the league-system. In its first season, the team was relegated from the 2. divisjon, and several clubs, including both Sarpsborg FK and Sparta, withdrew from the collaboration. The remaining clubs in the "Sarpsborg Fotball"-project formed a new club called Borg Fotball, which won promotion to the 2. divisjon in 2002, but was relegated again in 2003. Meanwhile, Sparta was promoted to the 2. divisjon the same season, and re-entered the collaboration club which now was renamed FK Sparta Sarpsborg. The club secured promotion to 1. divisjon in 2005 after decades in the lower divisions, with a 15–0 win against Fram Larvik on 22 October 2005. Ahead of the 2008 season Sparta withdrew their team and gave their place to the new club Sarpsborg 08. Sparta is currently playing in the fourth division, having been relegated from the 3. divisjon in 2016.

Honours
Norwegian top division
Runners-up: 1947–48
Norwegian Cup
Winners: 1952

Recent seasons
{|class="wikitable"
|-bgcolor="#efefef"
! Season
!
! Tier
! Pos.
! Pl.
! W
! D
! L
! GS
! GA
! P
!Cup
!Notes
|-
|2012
|4. divisjon
|5
|align=right bgcolor=#DDFFDD| 1
|align=right|26||align=right|19||align=right|6||align=right|1
|align=right|91||align=right|25||align=right|63
|
|Promoted to 3. divisjon
|-
|2013
|3. divisjon
|4
|align=right|10
|align=right|26||align=right|10||align=right|2||align=right|14
|align=right|52||align=right|48||align=right|32
|First round
|
|-
|2014
|3. divisjon
|4
|align=right bgcolor="#FFCCCC"| 12
|align=right|26||align=right|8||align=right|4||align=right|14
|align=right|39||align=right|52||align=right|28
|First qualifying round
|Relegated to 4. divisjon
|-
|2015
|4. divisjon
|5
|align=right bgcolor=#DDFFDD| 1
|align=right|26||align=right|20||align=right|5||align=right|1
|align=right|81||align=right|32||align=right|65
|First qualifying round
|Promoted to 3. divisjon
|-
|2016
|3. divisjon
|4
|align=right bgcolor="#FFCCCC"| 13
|align=right|26||align=right|4||align=right|4||align=right|18
|align=right|35||align=right|80||align=right|16
|Second round
|Relegated to 4. divisjon
|-
|2017
|4. divisjon
|5
|align=right |10
|align=right|26||align=right|8||align=right|7||align=right|11
|align=right|42||align=right|49||align=right|31
|First qualifying round
|
|-
|2018
|4. divisjon
|5
|align=right |7
|align=right|26||align=right|10||align=right|4||align=right|12
|align=right|53||align=right|64||align=right|34
|dnq
|
|}

References

External links
Official website

Football clubs in Norway
Sport in Sarpsborg
1928 establishments in Norway
Association football clubs established in 1928